Kadiwan is a village in Gram panchayat Kadiwan tehsil Rohru District Shimla, Himachal Pradesh. It is located on the border of tehsil Rohru and sharing its boundaries with  Kotkhai Tehsil of District Shimla. According to data released by the Election Commission Himachal Pradesh in Panchayat Election 2021, there is a total of  651 people in the village, with 358 males and 293 females.

References 

Villages in Shimla district